2K or 2-K may refer to:

Numerical
 2000 (number)
 2000, a year

Video and images
 2K resolution, a digital film resolution, display resolution, of 2048 horizontal pixels of data
 JPEG 2K, see JPEG 2000

Music
 2K (band), also known as The KLF
 2K Sports Mixtape (2006), hosted By Clinton Sparks; produced by Dan the Automator
 Crazy 2K Tour, see ...Baby One More Time Tour by Britney Spears
 Will 2K, see Willennium, Will Smith's second solo studio album

Video games

Video game publishers
 2K Games
 2K Sports
 2K Play
 2K Australia
 2K China
 2K Czech
 2K Marin
 Irrational Games (interimly known as 2K Boston)

Video games
 NBA 2K (video game)
 NFL 2K (video game)
 MLB 2K
 NBA 2K
 NHL 2K
 NFL 2K
 WWE 2K

Other
 2K-tan, see OS-tan, Japanese Internet meme
 Chaparral 2K, see  Chaparral Cars was a United States automobile racing team which built race cars from 1963 through 1970.
 MSW 2K, see Windows 2000
 2K, a model of Toyota K engine
 Two kingdoms doctrine, theological concept of separate domains for earthly and spiritual power

See also
K2 (disambiguation)